Zamia verschaffeltii is a species of plant in the family Zamiaceae. It is endemic to Mexico.

References

verschaffeltii
Endemic flora of Mexico
Near threatened plants
Taxonomy articles created by Polbot
Taxa named by Friedrich Anton Wilhelm Miquel